DeSantis or De Santis is an Italian surname. Use of the surname most frequently refers to Ron DeSantis, the 46th and current governor of Florida and a former member of the US House of Representatives.

Others with the surname DeSantis or De Santis include

Antonio De Santis, Italian poet
Carla DeSantis Black, music writer
Casey DeSantis, First Lady of Florida
Dan DeSantis, American football running back
Derek DeSantis, rock bassist
Dina De Santis, Italian actress
Eduardo De Santis, actor, producer and writer
Eros De Santis, Italian football player
Giuseppe De Santis, Italian film director
Ivan De Santis, Italian soccer player
Jaclyn DeSantis, American actress
Jason DeSantis,  American ice hockey player
Joe DeSantis, American basketball player, coach and commentator
Joe De Santis, American radio and television personality
John DeSantis, Canadian actor
Lucio De Santis, Italian actor
Mark DeSantis, American businessman
Mark DeSantis, Canadian ice hockey player and coach
Marko DeSantis, American rock guitarist for Sugarcult
Massimo De Santis, Italian football referee
Nick DeSantis, Canadian soccer player
Nicolas De Santis, internet entrepreneur
Orazio De Santis, Italian Renaissance engraver
Orchidea De Santis, Italian actress
Pasqualino De Santis, Italian cinematographer
Riccardo De Santis, Italian baseball player
Rita de Santis, Canadian politician
Ron DeSantis, Governor of Florida
Stanley DeSantis, American actor and businessman
Tony DeSantis, American entrepreneur
Tullio Francesco DeSantis, American contemporary artist, writer, and teacher

See also

De Sanctis (disambiguation)
De Santi

Italian-language surnames